Miroslava Sedláčková (born 19 May 1977) is a retired Czech Paralympic athlete and para cross-country skier. She has competed in four Paralympic Games: she took part in the 1998 and 2002 Winter Paralympics in the cross-country skiing at the Paralympics and 2008 and 2012 Summer Paralympics in athletics at the Paralympics.

In 2015, Sedláčková fell and broke her arm which developed into osteosarcoma then she retired from sport. After retirement, she has become a lawyer in Prague.

References

1977 births
Living people
Sportspeople from Prague
Paralympic athletes of the Czech Republic
Czech female sprinters
Czech female middle-distance runners
Czech female cross-country skiers
Cross-country skiers at the 1998 Winter Paralympics
Cross-country skiers at the 2002 Winter Paralympics
Athletes (track and field) at the 2008 Summer Paralympics
Athletes (track and field) at the 2012 Summer Paralympics
World Para Athletics Championships winners
Medalists at the World Para Athletics European Championships
Visually impaired middle-distance runners
Visually impaired sprinters
Paralympic sprinters
Paralympic middle-distance runners
Blind people
Czech people with disabilities